Mera Piya Ghar Aaya is a Punjabi Sufi Kafi (poem) written by noted 18th-century Punjabi Sufi saint and poet Baba Bulleh Shah. He composed this poem at the return of his spiritual guide Shah Inayat Qadiri. The song is part of most of the Qawwali performances. It is one of the best known songs of Nusrat Fateh Ali Khan and part of his album, Qawwali: The Essential Collection.

Renditions 
The Song is also sung by many notable artists, such as Nusrat Fateh Ali Khan, Sabri Brothers (i.e. Ghulam Farid Sabri and Maqbool Ahmed Sabri), Qawwal Bahauddin Khan, Rahat Fateh Ali Khan, Sher Ali & Mehr Ali, Badar Miandad, Sher Miandad Qawwal, and Fareed Ayaz & Abu Mohammed.

Lyrics Punjabi 
Ao Ni Sayyo Ral Deyo Ni Wadhai
Men War Paaya Sona Maahi
Gharyaal Deyo Nikalni
Mera Piya Ghar Aaya O Laalni

Piya Ghar Aaya
Sanu Allah Milaya
Hun Hoya Fazl Kamaalni
Mera Piya Ghar Aaya O Laalni

Ghari Ghari Ghadiyal Bajaave,
Raen Wasl Di Piya Ghataawe
Mere Munn Di Baat Na Paave,
Hathon Ja Sutto Ghariyal Ni
Mera Piya Ghar Aaya, O Laalni

Anhad Baaja Baje Shahaana,
Mutarib Sughara Taan Taraana
Bhull Gaya Ay Namaaz Dogaana,
Madh Piyaala Dain Kalaal Ni
Mera Piya Ghar Aaya, O Laalni

Bulla Shah Di Sej Piyaari,
Ni Men Taaran Haarey Taari
Allah Milaya Hun Aayi Vaari,
Hun Vicharan Hoya Muhaal Ni
Mera Piya Ghar Aaya, O Laalni.

Themes

References

Qawwali songs
Pakistani folk songs
Punjabi-language songs
18th-century songs
Songs with music by Anu Malik
Urdu-language songs